Nickel(II) bromide is the name for the inorganic compounds with the chemical formula NiBr2(H2O)x. The value of x can be 0 for the anhydrous material, as well as 2, 3, or 6 for the three known hydrate forms. The anhydrous material is a yellow-brown solid which dissolves in water to give blue-green hexahydrate (see picture).

Structure 
The structure of the nickel bromides varies with the degree of hydration. In all of these cases, the nickel(II) ion adopts an octahedral molecular geometry.  Similar structures are observed in aqueous solutions of nickel bromide.

Anhydrous NiBr2 adopts the hexagonal cadmium chloride structure. The interatomic distance for Ni-Br is 2.52—2.58 Å. Anhydrous NiBr2 is a paramagnet at room temperature. Upon cooling, it turns into an antiferromagnet at 52 K, and then into a helimagnet at 22.8 K.
The structure of the trihydrate has not been confirmed by X-ray crystallography.  It is assumed to adopt a chain structure.
The di- and hexahydrates adopt structures akin to those for the corresponding chlorides. The dihydrate consists of a linear chain, whereas the hexahydrate features isolated trans-[NiBr2(H2O)4] molecules together with two water molecules of crystallization.

Reactions and uses 
NiBr2 has Lewis acid character, as indicated by its tendency to hydrate and form adducts with a variety of other Lewis bases.

NiBr2 is also used to prepare catalysts for cross-coupling reactions and various carbonylations. NiBr2-glyme shows increased activity compared to NiCl2-glyme for some transformations.

Safety 
This compound is a suspected carcinogen.

References

Cited sources

Nickel compounds
Bromides
Metal halides